The KBC Night of Athletics is an annual athletics event at the Stadium De Veen in Heusden-Zolder, Belgium. It is officially presented and sponsored by the KBC Bank.

Meeting records

Men

Women

References

External links
 KBC Night of Athletics - Official Web Site
 KBC Night of Athletics Records

Athletics competitions in Belgium
European Athletic Association meetings
Sport in Heusden-Zolder
IAAF Grand Prix
1979 establishments in Belgium
Recurring sporting events established in 1979
IAAF World Outdoor Meetings